Seein' Red, White 'N' Blue is a 1943 American propaganda cartoon short featuring Popeye directed by Dan Gordon. The cartoon revolves around Bluto trying to escape the draft but ends up fighting alongside Popeye against some Japanese spies, Hirohito and Adolf Hitler.

Plot
While Bluto is busy at work in his stable he receives a letter calling him for his draft service in the Navy. Bluto is very reluctant to join in and pretends to be ill. Popeye, who works at the draft bureau, is suspicious and sends a female dummy in to create an enthusiastic reaction from him. Even though his trick works Bluto still refuses to join the Navy. In a desperate effort to become disabled Bluto jumps out of the window, followed by Popeye who tries to catch him. They both crash deep into the ground, in fact so deep that Satan himself asks them to leave Hell. After Bluto and Popeye have climbed out of the massive crater Satan is kicked by an angel, after which they both disappear.

Bluto tries to flee, but is hit in a car accident. Even though he is knocked out the ambulance is only interested in the tires of the vehicle and carries these away on a stretcher instead of Bluto. Bluto tries to get hit by a falling safe instead, but again Popeye rescues him. This angers Bluto so much that he locks Popeye inside the object and then throws it away. It crashes inside an orphanage, where several Imperial Japanese Army spies are undercover, dressed as babies. While Popeye is being beaten by the spies, Bluto drops by to inform him that his arms are bandaged and that he finally will be able to escape the draft. When Bluto sees that Popeye is in trouble, he tries to help, but both men are knocked out by the Japanese. While they are being ridiculed, Popeye grabs his spinach, eats it and gives some to Bluto (can and all). Both men defeat the Japanese and Popeye's fist reaches so far that he knocks out Hirohito. The Emperor is hit so hard that he falls on the backside of his horse, (creating a pun on the word "ass"), and says: "It should happen to Hitler!" Sure enough, the next scene cuts to Hitler, who gives a speech by saying: "B.O.!" ("body odor", a reference to a Lifebuoy soap commercial). Hitler too is beaten so hard that he loses his mustache. A title card appears, asking: "Is there a doctor in the house?", with the word "doctor" crossed out and "undertaker" written in crayon. While he lies unconscious, Hermann Göring runs in and asks his Führer melodramatically "to speak to him". Hitler just says "B.O." again, whereupon Göring pulls his face away in disgust.

The cartoon concludes with Bluto finally signing up for his draft. When Bluto asks how to spell his own name, the imprisoned Japanese spies sing "B-L-U-T-O", in reference to the commercial jingle for Jell-o from that time.

Notability
The cartoon is notable for being one of the few where Bluto and Popeye actually fight together to beat a common foe. Because of its dated references to World War II and offensive racial stereotyping of Japanese people, it is no longer shown on US television.

The style of the cartoon is more reminiscent of a Looney Tunes or Tex Avery cartoon, with wild, frenetic takes and fourth wall breaking gags geared at adults. Some of the jokes, like the use of the phrase "B.O." were used in several of Looney Tunes cartoons as well. This cartoon's score also features an excerpt of the tune of "I Don't Want To Walk Without You" which was first heard onscreen in Paramount's movie Sweater Girl.

References

External links
 

Popeye the Sailor theatrical cartoons
1943 animated films
American World War II propaganda shorts
World War II films made in wartime
Cultural depictions of Adolf Hitler
Cultural depictions of Hermann Göring
Cultural depictions of Hirohito
Animation based on real people
1940s American animated films
American black-and-white films
1943 short films
American animated short films
Paramount Pictures short films
Films about race and ethnicity
Japan in non-Japanese culture
Film controversies
Race-related controversies in animation
Anti-Japanese sentiment in the United States
Stereotypes of East Asian people
Ethnic humour